Force is an unincorporated community and census-designated place in Jay Township, Elk County, Pennsylvania, United States. As of the 2010 census it had a population of 253. It is located on Pennsylvania Route 255 between St. Marys and Penfield.

The community has the name of Jack Force, a frontiersman.

Demographics

References

Census-designated places in Pennsylvania
Coal towns in Pennsylvania
Census-designated places in Elk County, Pennsylvania